Two regiments of the British Army have been numbered the 112th Regiment of Foot:

112th Regiment of Foot (King's Royal Musqueteers), raised in 1761
112th Regiment of Foot (1794), raised in 1794